Swan Creek is an unincorporated community in western Yadkin County, North Carolina, United States, south of Jonesville. The community shares its name with the Swan Creek viticultural area.

The designation, the second in North Carolina, took effect May 27, 2008.

There are five vineyards located within the Swan Creek AVA: Raffaldini Vineyards in Ronda, and Windsor Run Cellars, Shadow Springs Vineyard, Dobbins Creek Vineyards, and Laurel Gray Vineyards in Hamptonville.

Swan Creek is named for the wild geese, erroneously called swans, that were spotted resting in a nearby stream. Quaker pioneers first settled in the area before 1797.

References

Unincorporated communities in North Carolina
Unincorporated communities in Yadkin County, North Carolina